Cyclophora dataria is a moth in the  family Geometridae. It is found  in North America, from British Columbia to California, east to Arizona and north to Montana. The habitat consists of mixed or deciduous woods with Quercus species.

The wingspan is 23–25 mm. The forewings are uniform yellowish to light brown with fine dark speckling and lines. The hindwings are similar. Adults are on wing in late spring and summer.

The larvae feed on the leaves of Quercus species. The colour of the larvae varies from  tan brown to grey. Larvae can be found in July and August.

References

Moths described in 1887
Cyclophora (moth)
Moths of North America